Limoges Handball is a French handball team based in Limoges, that plays in the LNH Division 1.

Crest, colours, supporters

Naming history

Kits

Sports Hall information

Name: – Palais des Sports de Beaublanc
City: – Limoges
Capacity: – 5516
Address: – Bd de Beaublanc, 87100 Limoges, France

Team

Current squad 

Squad for the 2022–23 season

Transfers
Transfers for the 2023–24 season

 Joining
  Gauthier Ivah (GK) (from  JS Cherbourg)
  Dino Slavić (GK) (from  RK Zagreb)
  Maxime Ogando (LW) (from  Grand Nancy Métropole Handball)
  Ihor Turchenko (LB) (from  HC Motor Zaporozhye)
  Jon Azkue (CB) (from  CD Bidasoa)

 Leaving
  Yann Genty (GK) (to  Saran Loiret HB)
  Yoav Lumbroso (CB) (to  Vive Kielce)
  Raul Nantes (LB) (to ?)

Former club members

Notable former players

  Yann Genty (2022–2023)
  Denis Serdarevic (2018–)
  Jérémy Suty (2019–2022)
  Omar Benali (2014–2016)
  Micke Brasseleur (2020–2021)
  Hichem Daoud (2021–)
  Khaled Ghoumal (2014–2017)
  Sid Ali Yahia (2014–2016)
  Nathan Bolaers (2018–2019)
  Igor Mandić (2015–2021)
  Ingars Dude (2018–)
  Yassine Idrissi (2019–2022)
  Bogdan Petričević (2016–2017)
  Jure Dolenec (2021–)
  Dragan Gajić (2020–)
  Igor Žabić (2020–2022)
  Juan Andreu (2019–2021)
  Juan del Arco (2020)
  Davor Čutura (2017–2018)

Former coaches

References

External links
  
 

French handball clubs
Sport in Limoges